R2-D2 is a fictional robot in the Star Wars franchise.

R2-D2 or R2D2 may also refer to:

 R2d2 (mouse gene)
 Right 2 Dream Too, a homeless people's organization in Portland, Oregon, US
 Phalanx CIWS, a naval defensive weapon system, nicknamed R2-D2
 Staatstrojaner, a German state-sponsored trojan horse computer program, nicknamed R2-D2

 "R2D2" Reverb device, manufactured by EMT

R2D2 German Swiss audio company, famed for reverb devices, known as Elektromesstechnik (EMT).
They made turntables, Professional audio equipment and world renowned reverb equipment.

They supplied most of the worlds leading recording studios including Abbey Road, London. 
In the mid 1970's they released a new unit the EMT 250 designed by Peter barnes, Karl Otto Bader and MIT Professor Barry Blesser. The unit was commonly known as the R2D2. It had a weird shape with strange colours, looking like a "Space Heater"

See EMT